Annadale may refer to:

Annadale, Shimla, India, a suburb
Annadale, Staten Island, New York, a neighborhood 
 Annadale (Staten Island Railway station)
Annadale (North Vernon, Indiana), U.S., a historic home
Annadale, South Australia, a locality 
Annadale Grammar School, Belfast, Northern Ireland

See also 
 Annandale (disambiguation)